A list of Spanish-produced and co-produced feature films released in Spain in 1992. The domestic theatrical release date is favoured.

Films

See also 
 7th Goya Awards

References

External links
 Spanish films of 1992 at the Internet Movie Database

1992
Spanish
Films